Artocarpus parvus is a species of plant in the family Moraceae. It is endemic to South-East Asia and Southern China. The species is distinguished by the dark-red and rough bark of the tree. Fruit have yellow-orange and velutinous peel, while the pulp is pink-orange.

References

Flora of China
parvus